Kang Sar (also Romanized as Kāng Sar) is a village in Chehel Shahid Rural District, in the Central District of Ramsar County, Mazandaran Province, Iran. At the 2006 census, its population was 398, in 108 families.

References 

Populated places in Ramsar County